Pendas or Kangkar Pendas is a fisherman village in Gelang Patah, Iskandar Puteri, Johor Bahru District, Johor, Malaysia.

References

Iskandar Puteri
Villages in Johor